Fabian Holland (born 11 July 1990) is a German professional footballer who plays as a defender for SV Darmstadt 98.

Career 
Holland began his career in the youth teams of FSV Forst Borgsdorf, before joining Bundesliga club Hertha BSC in 2003. Working his way up through the youth divisions, he made the jump to the reserves in 2008, and started regularly as of the 2009–10 season. In summer 2010, Holland was diagnosed with Wolff–Parkinson–White syndrome, and had to undergo a heart operation. He recovered quickly from the operation, and began playing again in October 2010. In February 2011, he trained with the Hertha's team for the first time. On 21 April 2012, Holland made his Bundesliga debut when he started against 1. FC Kaiserslautern.  Hertha were relegated that year, but Holland became more of a regular in the Hertha side during the 2012–13 2. Bundesliga season. Holland was loaned out to SV Darmstadt 98 for the 2014–15 season in the 2. Bundesliga where he became a regular and managed to get promoted to the Bundesliga.

On 5 July 2015, Holland signed for Darmstadt 98 for two years.

Career statistics

1.Includes German Cup.
2.Includes Relegation playoff.

References

External links 
 Profile at HerthaBSC.de
 Fabian Holland at kicker.de 
 

1990 births
Living people
Footballers from Berlin
German footballers
Germany youth international footballers
Association football midfielders
Bundesliga players
2. Bundesliga players
Hertha BSC players
Hertha BSC II players
SV Darmstadt 98 players